Conus berdulinus is a species of sea snail, a marine gastropod mollusk in the family Conidae, the cone snails and their allies.

Like all species within the genus Conus, these snails are predatory and venomous. They are capable of "stinging" humans, therefore live ones should be handled carefully or not at all.

Description
The size of the shell varies between 48 mm and 100 mm.

Distribution
This species occurs in the Indian Ocean from Natal, South Africa to Mozambique and the Mascarenes, Somalia; off Southern Oman and Southern India; in the Pacific Ocean off Midway and Hawaii; in the South China Sea and off the Philippines.

References

 Veillard, M., 1972. New cone from Reunion. Of Sea and Shore 3(4): 176
 Röckel, D., Korn, W. & Kohn, A.J. (1995). A Manual of Living Conidae. Verlag Christa. Wiesbaden : Hemmen. 358 pp.
 Tucker J.K. & Tenorio M.J. (2009) Systematic classification of Recent and fossil conoidean gastropods. Hackenheim: Conchbooks. 296 pp.
 Puillandre N., Duda T.F., Meyer C., Olivera B.M. & Bouchet P. (2015). One, four or 100 genera? A new classification of the cone snails. Journal of Molluscan Studies. 81: 1–23

External links
 The Conus Biodiversity website
 Cone Shells – Knights of the Sea
 
 Holotype in MNHN, Paris

berdulinus
Gastropods described in 1972